Juan Camacho (born September 5, 1972) is a retired male long-distance runner from Mexico who specialized in the marathon. He set his personal best time (2:11:14) in the marathon at the 2002 JTBC Seoul Marathon.

Achievements

References

1972 births
Living people
Mexican male long-distance runners
Central American and Caribbean Games gold medalists for Mexico
Competitors at the 1998 Central American and Caribbean Games
Central American and Caribbean Games medalists in athletics
20th-century Mexican people